Leslie Townsend may refer to:

 Leslie Townsend (cricketer) (1903–1993), English cricketer
 Leslie Townsend (Royal Navy officer) (1924–1999), Defence Services Secretary, 1979–1982